, sometimes referred to as 'Shisen', 'Four Rivers' or simply 'Rivers,' is a Japanese tile-based game which uses Mahjong tiles, and is similar to Mahjong solitaire. The objective of the game is to match similar tiles in pairs until every tile has been removed from the playing field. Numerous computer based versions of the game have been developed.

Rules 
Player choose a pair of identical tiles to connect, and the connection path must not exceed two turns. If the requirements are met, two tiles will be eliminated. The player's task is to eliminate all the tiles on the board. The game is over if future moves are not possible and tiles are left on the board, or the player successfully removes all the tiles.

List of games 
 Sports Match (1989, Arcade)
 Shisen-Sho: Joshiryo-hen/Match It (1989, Arcade)
 Shisen-Sho (1990, MS-DOS)
 Lin Wu's Challenge (1990, Amiga OCS, Atari ST; 1991, MS-DOS)
 Shisen-Sho - Match-Mania (1990, Game Boy)
 Shisen-Sho II (1992, MS-DOS)
 Shisen-Sho II/Match It II (1993, Arcade)
 Shisen-Sho 2000 (1997, Windows)
 Super Shisen-Sho 2001 (2001, Windows)
 KAWAI连连看2 (2002, Windows)
 KAWAI连连看2003 (2003, Windows)
 KAWAI连连看2004 (2004, Windows)
 KAWAI连连看2005 (2005, Windows)
 Shisen Sho Mahjong Connect (2018, Android, iOS)
 Shisensho Solitaire (2019, Windows)
 Shisen-Sho Nikakudori (2020, Nintendo Switch)
 Pretty Girls Rivers (2021, Windows)

Images

See also 

 Mahjong tiles
 Mahjong solitaire
 Mahjong

References

External links
 Shisen Sho - an open source version written in Seed7

Solitaire Mahjong tile games
Linux games